Ballarat is an urban area in Victoria, Australia.

Ballarat may also refer to:

Places
 Ballarat, California, a ghost town in Inyo County, California, US
 City of Ballarat, a local government area in Victoria, Australia
 Ballarat Central, a locality within urban Ballarat, Victoria, Australia
 Ballarat Province, a former electorate of the Victorian Legislative Council until 2006
 Division of Ballarat, an Australian electoral division
 Balarat, Colorado (also spelled Ballarat), a ghost town in Boulder County, Colorado, USA

Ships
 HMAS Ballarat (J184), a Bathurst-class corvette serving from 1940 to 1947
 HMAS Ballarat (FFH 155), an Anzac-class frigate commissioned in 2004
 P&O Liner Ballarat, in the List of shipwrecks of Cornwall

See also
 Ballaarat (Locomotive)